Wanted (Swedish: Efterlyst) is a 1939 Swedish drama film directed by Schamyl Bauman and starring Edvin Adolphson, Birgit Rosengren and Elof Ahrle. It was shot at the Centrumateljéerna Studios in Stockholm.

Synopsis
A woman sitting in a Stockholm cafe hears to her surprise on the radio that she is wanted by the police.

Cast
 Edvin Adolphson as 	Gunnar Leijde
 Birgit Rosengren as 	Marja Elisabeth Benzon
 Elof Ahrle as 	Erik Svensson
 Thor Modéen as Patrik Rosén, waiter
 Isa Quensel as Ulla Ståhle
 Carin Swensson as 	Britta Pettersson
 Linnéa Hillberg as 	Elisaberth Johanni
 Nils Hultgren as 	Håkan Svennson
 Karin Kavli as Mrs. von Meissenfeldt
 Carl Deurell as 	Callerholm
 Marianne Aminoff as 	Linnéa
 Gösta Cederlund as The Mayor
 Julia Cæsar as 	Mrs. Jansson
 Helge Hagerman as Andersson
 Margit Andelius as Office Clerk 
 Gustaf Färingborg as Lindberg
 Inga-Lill Åhström as 	Lilian
 Gösta Bodin as 	Restaurateur
 Helge Kihlberg as 	Restaurateur 
 John Melin as 	Restaurateur 
 Bellan Roos as Waitress 
 Carl Browallius as Reverend 
 Georg Fernqvist as 	Janitor 
 Manne Grünberger as Errand Boy
 Ludde Juberg as 	Drunk man 
 Magnus Kesster as 	Drunk man

References

Bibliography 
 Qvist, Per Olov & von Bagh, Peter. Guide to the Cinema of Sweden and Finland. Greenwood Publishing Group, 2000.

External links 
 

1939 films
Swedish drama films
1939 drama films
1930s Swedish-language films
Films directed by Schamyl Bauman
Films set in Stockholm
1930s Swedish films